The 2015 United Kingdom summer budget was delivered by George Osborne, the Chancellor of the Exchequer, to the House of Commons on Wednesday, 8 July 2015.	

This was the first fully Conservative budget since that presented by Kenneth Clarke in 1996.

Background

The background to the budget was that of significant economic growth at 3%.

The budget proposes spending of £742 billion and an income of £673 billion in 2015-16; a deficit of £69 billion (almost 10% of UK public spending).

The budget passed with a majority of 30 votes (320 votes for, 290 against with 36 abstentions).

All Conservative MPs voted for the budget (with 9 abstentions). The Labour party voted against the bill with 19 MPs abstaining.

Measures

 £750 million extra granted to HM Revenue and Customs to tackle tax avoidance
 Income tax personal allowance raised to £11,000
 Ordoliberal measures to introduce tax incentives for large corporations to create apprenticeships, aiming for 3 million new apprenticeships by 2020
 A national living wage of £9 an hour to be introduced by 2020 for 25+ year olds
 Inheritance tax threshold raised to £1m by 2017 for married couples
An £800 increase in the amount of maintenance loan paid out to poorer students, paid for by replacing maintenance grants with loans
 Benefit cap reduced to £23,000 in London and £20,000 in the rest of the country
 Starting in April 2016, the Dividend Tax Credit will be removed and replaced with a tax-free Dividend Allowance of £5,000 for all taxpayers, with new rates of tax for dividend income above that amount
 Confirmation that the BBC has agreed to absorb the £650m cost of providing free television licences for over-75s
Non-domiciled individuals
Non-domicile status can no longer be inherited
 Non-domiciles who have lived in the UK for the past 15 of the last 20 years will have to pay normal taxation

Taxes

Spending

References

United Kingdom
Budget
2015 07
July 2015 events in the United Kingdom
George Osborne